Mohammad Saleh Bhutani was the second Deputy Chief Justice of the Supreme Court Indonesia for judicial affairs.

References

1946 births
Living people